Fox Falls is a waterfall in Otsego County, New York. It is located south-southeast of Richfield Springs.

Waterfalls of New York (state)
Landforms of Otsego County, New York
Tourist attractions in Otsego County, New York